Shanga (Shangawa, Shonga, Shongawa) is a Mande language of Nigeria.

Location and status
Shanga is a town situated in Sokoto State, Nigeria.

The Shanga language is an endangered language and the Shanga people also speak the Hausa language. The language is only used at home. Outside home people speak Hausa. The Hausa name for the language is Shanganci or Shanganchi.

Classification
Shanga is a Mande language. It is related to the Kyanga language, also known as Tyenga, spoken in Benin and Nigeria, and it form a group known as the Shanga–Tyenga languages.

References

Mande languages
Languages of Nigeria